Roberto Quartaroli (born 29 March 1988) is a retired Italian rugby union player, native of L'Aquila, he normally plays as a centre. He represented Italy on 4 occasions.

After playing for Italy Under 20 in 2008, from 210 to 2016, Quartaroli was named in the Emerging Italy squad.
In January 2012 he was called up to the Italian team for the 2012 Six Nations Championship.

References

External links
ESPN Profile

1988 births
Living people
People from L'Aquila
Italian rugby union players
Italy international rugby union players
Zebre Parma players
Fiamme Oro Rugby players
Rugby union wings
Sportspeople from the Province of L'Aquila